I Came to Dance is the third solo studio album from Nils Lofgren.

Track listing 
All tracks composed by Nils Lofgren; except where indicated
 "I Came to Dance" 4:30
 "Rock Me at Home" 4:30
 "Home Is Where the Hurt Is" 4:12
 "Code of the Road" 4:51
 "Happy Ending Kids" 3:01
 "Goin' South" 4:03
 "To Be a Dreamer" 3:45
 "Jealous Gun" 3:50
 "Happy" (Mick Jagger, Keith Richards) 3:22

Personnel
Nils Lofgren - lead guitar, keyboards, vocals
Rev. Patrick Henderson - piano
Tom Lofgren - rhythm guitar
Wornell Jones - bass
Andy Newmark - drums
Mike Mainieri - vibraphone on "Code of the Road", "Happy Ending Kids" and "Goin' South"
Tom Miller - acoustic guitar on "Home is Where the Hurt Is" and "To Be a Dreamer"
Rubens Bassini - congas on "I Came to Dance"
Hugh McCracken - harmonica on "Happy"
Frank Floyd, Lani Groves, Patti Austin, Ullanda McCullough, William Eaton, Zachary Sanders, Anthony Hinton, Christine Wiltshire, Diane Sumler, Luther Van Dross, Theresa V. Reed - backing vocals
Luther Van Dross and William Eaton - backing vocal arrangement
William Eaton - string and horn arrangements
Technical
Bob Dawson, Jack Malken, Randy Adler - engineer
Ted Jensen - mastering
Ed Caraeff - art direction, photography

References

1977 albums
Nils Lofgren albums
A&M Records albums